Herochroma xuthopletes is a moth of the family Geometridae first described by Louis Beethoven Prout in 1934. It is found on Sumatra and Borneo. The habitat consists of lowland alluvial forests.

References

Moths described in 1934
Pseudoterpnini
Moths of Asia